The Soundgarden may refer to:

Soundgarden, an American rock band
A Sound Garden, a public art work in Seattle, Washington